Joseph Campbell (born May 8, 1955) is a former American football player who played defensive end in the National Football League (NFL) from 1977 through 1981 for the New Orleans Saints, Oakland Raiders and Tampa Bay Buccaneers. He played college football at Maryland. In 1992, Campbell was inducted into the Delaware Sports Museum and Hall of Fame. Campbell also taught physical education at Ambassador University (TX) in the 1990s. As noted in March 1993 news article Texas couple demonstrates
spirit of service, volunteerism

References

stats on footballdb.com
bucpower profile

1955 births
Living people
Players of American football from Wilmington, Delaware
All-American college football players
American football defensive ends
American football defensive tackles
New Orleans Saints players
Oakland Raiders players
Tampa Bay Buccaneers players
Maryland Terrapins football players